Rhône is a department of east-central France, in the central-southeastern Auvergne-Rhône-Alpes region. Named after the river Rhône, its prefecture is Lyon. Its sole subprefecture is Villefranche-sur-Saône. In 2019, it had a population of 1,875,747.

History 
The department was created on August 12, 1793, when the former Rhône-et-Loire was split into two departments: Rhône and Loire.

Originally, the eastern border of Rhône was the city of Lyon itself, so that the communes immediately east of Lyon belonged to neighboring departments. With the growth of Lyon and the extension of its urban area into communes such as Villeurbanne, the limits of the department were judged impractical as they left the suburbs of Lyon outside of Rhône. Thus, Rhône was enlarged several times to incorporate into it the suburbs of Lyon from neighboring department:
 In 1852, four communes from Isère were incorporated into Rhône.
 In 1967, 23 communes of Isère and six communes of Ain were incorporated into Rhône.
 In 1971, one commune from Isère was incorporated into Rhône.

With these enlargements, the area of the department increased from 2,791 km2 to 3,249 km2 (16.4% larger). At the 1999 French census, the original department of Rhône would have had only 1,071,288 inhabitants, which means that the population in the territories added in the last two centuries was 507,581 inhabitants in 1999.

In 2015 the Metropolis of Lyon was separated from the department of Rhône. Rhône lost 16% of its territory, and 75% of its population. Lyon, although no longer part of the department, remains its administrative center.

Geography 

Rivers include the Rhône and the Saône (which joins the Rhône in Lyon). The neighboring departments are Ain, Isère, Loire and Saône-et-Loire.

Demographics
Population development since 1801 (with Lyon Metropolis) :

Before the Metropolis of Lyon was separated from the department, over 75% of its population lived within the Greater Lyon, which included all of the largest cities of the Rhône department, apart from Villefranche-sur-Saône.

The most populous commune of the new department of Rhône is Villefranche-sur-Saône. As of 2019, there are 5 communes with more than 10,000 inhabitants:

Politics 

The President of the Departmental Council is Christophe Guilloteau, a member of the Republicans (LR).

Current National Assembly Representatives

This list includes representatives from Lyon Metropolis created in 2015 as a separate department.

Tourism

See also 
 Cantons of the Rhône department
 Communes of the Rhône department
 Arrondissements of the Rhône department
 French language
 Arpitan language

References

External links

Prefecture website 
Departmental Council website 
69.pagesd.info - Webportal and directory of communes and web sites of the Rhône (69) département website 

 
1793 establishments in France
Departments of Auvergne-Rhône-Alpes
States and territories established in 1793
Massif Central